Marcus Aurelius Hitchcock (born 1963) is a retired United States Navy rear admiral who last served as the director for strategy, plans, and policy of the United States Space Command. A naval aviator, he has commanded the Navy Warfare Development Command and Carrier Strike Group 3.

Early life and education
Raised in Salt Lake City, Utah, Hitchcock graduated from Brighton High School in 1981. He then attended the United States Naval Academy, graduating in 1985 with a B.S. degree in ocean engineering. He also attended the Naval War College and Armed Forces Staff College.

Military career
Hitchcock received his commission in the United States Navy in 1985 after graduating from the United States Naval Academy. He was designated a naval aviator in 1987.

In September 2017, Hitchcock took command of the Navy Warfare Development Command. While in command, he was nominated for promotion to rear admiral. From June 2019 to August 2020, he served as the director of plans and policy of the newly established United States Space Command. This was his last assignment before retiring from active duty.

Personal life
Hitchcock married Terri Lynn Westfall on May 19, 1990 in Oak Harbor, Washington.

Dates of promotion

References

External links
 

1963 births
Living people
Place of birth missing (living people)
Military personnel from Salt Lake City
United States Naval Academy alumni
United States Naval Aviators
United States Navy personnel of the Gulf War
Recipients of the Air Medal
Recipients of the Distinguished Flying Cross (United States)
United States Navy personnel of the Iraq War
Recipients of the Legion of Merit
United States Navy rear admirals